The Tulu people or Tuluvas are an ethno-linguistic group from Southern India. They are native speakers of the Tulu language and the region they traditionally inhabit is known as Tulu Nadu. This region comprises the districts of Dakshina Kannada and Udupi in Karnataka and a part of Kasaragod district in Kerala, with Mangalore, Karnataka being the commercial hub. The Census report of 2011 reported a population of 1,846,427 native Tulu speakers living in India.

Etymology
According to Keralolpathi, the name Tuluva comes from that of one of the Cheraman Perumal kings of Kerala, who fixed his residence in the northern portion of his dominions just before its separation from Kerala, and who was called Tulubhan Perumal.

Mythology
According to mythology, Tulu Nadu was reclaimed by Parashurama from the sea. According to the 17th-century Malayalam work Keralolpathi, the lands of Kerala and Tulu Nadu were recovered from the Arabian Sea by the axe-wielding warrior sage Parasurama, the sixth avatar of Vishnu (hence, Kerala is also called Parasurama Kshetram 'The Land of Parasurama'). Parasurama threw his axe across the sea, and the water receded as far as it reached. According to legend, this new area of land extended from Gokarna to Kanyakumari. The land which rose from sea was filled with salt and unsuitable for habitation; so Parasurama invoked the Snake King Vasuki, who spat holy poison and converted the soil into fertile lush green land. Out of respect, Vasuki and all snakes were appointed as protectors and guardians of the land. P. T. Srinivasa Iyengar theorised, that Senguttuvan may have been inspired by the Parasurama legend, which was brought by early Aryan settlers.

People and identity
Tulu speakers are divided into various castes. The major Tulu speaking castes are, Bunt, Billava, Shettigars,Tulu Gowdas, Devadiga, Kulalas, Koraga, Mogaveera,  Tulu Brahmins, Vishwakarmas, Nayaks etc. Mangalorean Protestants are also Tulu speakers. A Tulu woman is called Tuluvedi  Bhuta-aradhana in Tulu Nadu is similar to the rest of South India though the bhutas as well as their worship differ. The kola or nema is the yearly ceremony celebrating the festival of bhutas. They have attained a godly status among some worshippers, mainly non-Brahmins, and even have their own bhuta-sthanas (a place of abode similar to temples). Bhutas can be animistic as in Panjurli (pig) or Pili-bhuta (tiger). However, in many villages the Brahmins, who consider these spirits as their protectorates, conduct the yearly ceremonies. A second variety can be representatives of characters taken out of the Puranas like Berme (Brahma), Lekkesiri (Raktesvari, Kali) or Vishnumurti etc. A third category is deified human beings like Gulige, Annappe, and Koti-Chananye etc. The fourth kind is strictly local characters like Male-Chandi (from the male-Nadu), Ullaldi (from Ullal), and Malaraye (from the Ghats). Then there are bhutas which provide comical relief during nemas, namely Marlu-Jumadi (crazy Jumadi) or Potte (dumb/deaf demigod). Newer bhutas also have been added like Posa-bhuta (new demigod), Vokku-Ballala, and Muttappe etc.

Culture

Tuluvas follow a matrilineal system of inheritance known as Aliyasantana, where inheritance is from uncle to nephew, except for Brahmins, Tulu Gowda, Shettigar caste and Vishwakarmas. It is similar to the Marumakkathayam of Kerala. Other distinctive features include the rituals of Yakshagana, Bhuta Kola, Nagaradhane Aati kalenja and Kambala. Bhuta Kola is similar to Theyyam in Kerala.

Tuluva New Year is called Bisu Parba, which falls on the same day as Baisakhi, Vishu and the Thai New Year.

Tuluva Paddanas are sung narratives, which are part of several closely related singing traditions in Tulu language, Paddanas are sung during occasions which describe the evolution of Tulu tribes and Tulu culture.

Demand for Tulu Nadu

From India's independence and following the reorganization of states, the Tuluvas have been demanding national language status for Tulu and a separate state for themselves called Tulu Nadu (Land of Tuluvas), based on their language and distinct culture. Though somewhat subdued for a while, this demand has grown stronger in recent years. Several organizations like the Tulu Rajya Horata Samiti have taken up the cause of the Tuluvas, and frequent meetings and demonstrations are held across towns in Tulunadu (such as Mangalore and Udupi) to voice their demands.

Prominent Tuluvas

See also
 Mangalorean cuisine
 Udupi cuisine
 Tulu language
 Gokak agitation

References

Further reading 
  
 
 
 
 
 
 
 

 
Mangalorean society
Social groups of Karnataka
Social groups of Kerala